Swan is a beer brand owned by Lion Nathan. It was originally brewed by the Swan Brewery in Western Australia, but brewing was moved to South Australia in 2013 and to New South Wales in 2021. On 4 August 2022, it was announced that some of the brewing of Swan Draught, but not the Emu varieties, would be moved back to Western Australia, at the Little Creatures Brewery in Fremantle.

Varieties

 Swan Draught is a mild lager, with a medium bitter flavour and a full body (4.4% alc/vol). It has been in production since 1857.
 Emu Bitter is a full-strength lager (4% alc/vol). The recipe has not changed since it was first launched in 1923
 Emu Export is a medium bittered and full-bodied lager (4.2% alc/vol), first launched in 1954.
 Emu Draft is a mid-strength lager (3.0% alc/vol). It has been in production since 1992

Former products
 Swan Stout - a unique stout naturally brewed using a centuries-old brewing style (7.4% alc/vol).
  Swan Gold - a mid-strength lager, with a small head and a quiet bitter aroma (3.5% alc/vol). Production commenced in 1978. Ended 2003.
 Swan Export Lager - production commenced in 1933
 Swan Premium Lager - released following Australia II winning the America's Cup in 1983.
 Swan Special Light - a fully brewed low alcohol (0.9%) beer released in July 1984.
 Swan Skol
 Phipson's Australian Pilsner - produced by Swan Brewery for export in the late 1930s and continued into the 1940s
 Hannan's Lager
 1857 Bitter - a mid-strength lager (3.5% alc/vol). Production commenced in March 1996.

See also

 List of breweries in Australia

References

External links
Grogtag Custom Beer Labels

Australian beer brands